Tazwell Leigh Anderson Jr. (November 15, 1938 – September 26, 2016) was an American football player who played for the Georgia Tech Yellow Jackets football team and professionally for the St. Louis Cardinals and the Atlanta Falcons.  While at Georgia Tech, he was a member of the Chi Phi Fraternity. In 2005, he was elected to the Georgia Sports Hall of Fame.

After his professional sports career, Anderson became an Atlanta-area realtor, and owns TazMedia and Taz Anderson Realty. He helped create the Centennial Tower (a large olympic flame commemorating the 1996 Summer Olympics) next to The Varsity.

Anderson was also deeply involved with the Georgia Tech Athletic Association; for ten years, he was a trustee, and "has been [a] member of or chair of every major project for the Tech Athletic Association for the past 30 years." He organized and served as developer of the 1985 renovation of Alexander Memorial Coliseum. He died on September 26, 2016 at the age of 77.

References

External links
Taz Anderson Realty Company

1938 births
2016 deaths
Georgia Tech Yellow Jackets football players
Atlanta Falcons players
St. Louis Cardinals (football) players
Players of American football from Savannah, Georgia
American football tight ends